The 2001 Seattle Seahawks season was the franchise's 26th season in the National Football League (NFL), The second of two seasons the Seahawks played at Husky Stadium while Qwest Field was being built and the third under head coach Mike Holmgren. They improved on their 6–10 record from 2000 and finished the season at 9–7. The Seahawks were in the playoff hunt until the last game of the season; the Baltimore Ravens' win over the Minnesota Vikings on the last Monday Night game of the year ended Seattle's post-season bid. The 2001 season was the final season for the Seahawks in the American Football Conference (AFC) and the second and final season they played at Husky Stadium while Seahawks Stadium (now known as Lumen Field) was being built.

Before the season, the Seahawks signed free agent quarterback Trent Dilfer, and traded for quarterback Matt Hasselbeck. Hasselbeck eventually won the starting position over Dilfer. The Seahawks also signed future Hall of Fame defensive tackle John Randle, who spent the last 11 seasons with the Minnesota Vikings and would make the Pro Bowl in his first season with the Seahawks.

The season saw the emergence of the second year running back Shaun Alexander after Ricky Watters was injured for most of the season. Watters retired after the season ended.

It was also the final season the Seahawks wore their traditional blue and green uniforms, and their last year in the AFC West as they returned to the NFC West in the 2002 NFL season. 

The last remaining active member of the 2001 Seattle Seahawks was quarterback Matt Hasselbeck, who retired after the 2015 season.

Offseason

NFL draft

Personnel

Staff

Final roster

     Starters in bold.
 (*) Denotes players that were selected for the 2002 Pro Bowl.

Schedule

Preseason

Source: Seahawks Media Guides

Regular season
Divisional matchups have the AFC West playing the NFC East.

Source: 2001 NFL season results

Standings

Game Summaries

Preseason

Week P1: at Indianapolis Colts

Week P2: vs. Arizona Cardinals

Week P3: at San Francisco 49ers

Week P4: vs. New Orleans Saints

Regular season

Week 1: at Cleveland Browns

Week 2: vs. Philadelphia Eagles

Week 3: at Oakland Raiders

Week 4: vs. Jacksonville Jaguars

Week 5: vs. Denver Broncos

Week 7: vs. Miami Dolphins

Week 8: at Washington Redskins

Week 9: vs. Oakland Raiders

Week 10: at Buffalo Bills

Week 11: at Kansas City Chiefs

Week 12: vs. San Diego Chargers

Week 13 at Denver Broncos

Week 14: vs. Dallas Cowboys

Week 15: at New York Giants

Week 16: at San Diego Chargers

Week 17: vs. Kansas City Chiefs

References

External links
Seahawks draft history at NFL.com
2001 NFL season results at NFL.com

Seattle
Seattle Seahawks seasons
Seattle Seahawks